Lasha Gogitadze (born June 4, 1987 in Kutaisi) is an amateur Georgian Greco-Roman wrestler, who played for the men's featherweight category. Gogitadze represented Georgia at the 2008 Summer Olympics in Beijing, where he competed for the men's 55 kg class. He first defeated China's Jiao Huafeng in the preliminary round of sixteen, before losing out the quarterfinal match to Armenia's Roman Amoyan, with a two-set technical score (1–4, 2–3), and a classification point score of 1–3.

References

External links
NBC 2008 Olympics profile
 

Male sport wrestlers from Georgia (country)
1987 births
Living people
Olympic wrestlers of Georgia (country)
Wrestlers at the 2008 Summer Olympics
Sportspeople from Kutaisi